Munishvara or Munīśvara Viśvarūpa (born 1603) was an Indian mathematician who wrote several commentaries including one on astronomy Siddhanta Sarvabhauma (1646) which included descriptions of astronomical instruments such as the pratoda yantra. Another commentary was Lilavativivruti. Very little is known about his other than that he came from a family of astronomers including his father Ranganatha who wrote a commentary called Gụ̄hārthaprakaśa/Gūḍhārthaprakāśikā, a commentary on the Suryasiddhanta. His grandfather Ballala had his origins in Dadhigrama in Vidharba and had moved to Benares and several sons wrote commentaries on astronomy and mathematics. Munisvara's Siddhantasarvabhauma had the patronage of Shah Jahan like his paternal uncle Krishna Daivagna. He was opposed to fellow mathematician Kamalakara whose brother also wrote a critique of Munisvara's bhangi-vibhangi method for planetary motions. He was also opposed to the adoption of some mathematical ideas in spherical trigonometry from Arab scholars. An edition of his Siddhanta Sarvabhauma was published from the Princess of Wales Sarasvati Bhavana Granthamala edited by Gopinath Kaviraj. Munisvara's book had twelve chapters in two parts. The second part had notes on astronomical instruments. He was a follower of Bhaskara II.

References

External links 
 Manuscript version of Siddhant Sarvabhauma (1627) from the Asiatic Society of Bombay
 Manuscript from Raghunath Temple, Jammu
 Siddhanta Sarvabhauma - Saraswati Bhavan - (Part 1) (Part 2)

17th-century Indian mathematicians